Mijail Mulkay Bordon (born April 20, 1974 in Cuba) is a Cuban actor.

Television 
CELIA: La vida de Celia Cruz - Tico Fuentes (Tito Puente) (2015)
Voltea pa' que te Enamores - Mateo (2014)
En otra piel - Soler Hernández (2014)
''Cosita Linda' - Lisandro (2013)
"El Clon (2010) .... Mohammed
"Los caballeros las prefieren brutas" (2010) .... Rodrigo Florez
"Victorinos" (2009) TV series .... Adopted Victorino Pérez
"La quiero a morir" (2008) TV series .... Rito Sansón
"La ex" .... Leonardo Guáqueta
"Aunque estés lejos" - Lazaro
"La Mujer En El Espejo" - Camilo
"Entre ciclones" 2003
"Hacerse el sueco" 2001- Cuba
"Miradas" 2001- Spain
T"Lista de espera" ... Manolo
Candela (2000)
"Entre Mamparas" (1996) TV series

References 

Colombian male telenovela actors
Colombian male television actors
1974 births
Living people